Memories of the Sword (lit. "Female Warrior: Memories of the Sword") is a 2015 South Korean martial arts/romance period drama co-written and directed by Park Heung-sik, starring Lee Byung-hun, Jeon Do-yeon and Kim Go-eun.

Plot
This is a story of three swordsmen, Poong-cheon, Seol-rang, and Deok-gi, who led an uprising during the Goryeo era. When their desire for freedom and justice is about to be fulfilled, Deok-gi betrays them, leading to the death of Poong-cheon, and to Seol-rang disappearing along with Poong-cheon's infant daughter Hong-ee. When Seol-rang leaves, Deok-gi intones the prophecy that "You, no, not just you, but you and I both will be killed by Hong-ee."

Eighteen years later, Seol-rang, now called Wallso, is a blind woman with two children who manages a tea house at Byukran port. Determined to take revenge on Deok-gi, Wallso tries to teach Hong-ee to become a master of the sword, but Hong-ee (who changed her name to Seol-hee) is much more interested in day-to-day affairs than what happened to her father in the past.

One day, a big sword match hosted by the powerful military ruler Deok-gi (now known as Yoo-baek) is held in the market. Seol-hee participates in the match despite Wallso's objections. As the match progresses, she ends up fighting Yull, who is the
master of the sword.

Yoo-baek realizes that Seol-hee's skill with the sword is similar to Seol-rang's, whom he had once loved. Yoo-baek orders his
subordinates to catch Seol-hee, but she is able to run away. That same night, Seol-hee learns how her father, Poong-cheon died. Wallso tells her that there are two enemies that Seol-hee is destined to vanquish: Yoo-baek, and Wallso herself. Shocked and desperate, Seol-hee leaves home: the beginning of a long journey of revenge.

Cast

Main
Lee Byung-hun as Deok-gi/Yoo-baek
Jeon Do-yeon as Seol-rang/Wallso
Kim Go-eun as Hong-ee/Seol-hee

Supporting
Lee Geung-young as  Teacher
Kim Tae-woo as Jon-bok
Lee Jun-ho as Yull
Kim Soo-an as Gu-seul
Kim Young-min as Wang
Sung Yu-bin as Gam-cho
Bae Soo-bin as Poong-cheon
 Moon Sung-keun as Lee Ee-myeong (special appearance)

References

External links
 

South Korean historical action films
South Korean martial arts films
Films directed by Park Heung-sik (born 1965)
Lotte Entertainment films
South Korean films about revenge
2015 martial arts films
2010s historical action films
Films set in the Goryeo Dynasty
2010s South Korean films